Great Escape is a South Korean comedy reality show that airs on tvN every Sunday at 10:40pm (KST), having premiered on 1 July 2018. Among the cast are Kang Ho-dong, Kim Jong-min, Shindong, Yoo Byung-jae, Kim Dong-hyun and P.O. The first season ended on 23 September 2018. The second season aired between 17 March and 9 June 2019. The third season aired on 1 March–14 June 2020.

The fourth season aired between 11 July and 3 October 2021.

Overview

Season 1
Before each phase of the escape challenge, the members first gather in the bus. Since the second challenge (third episode) of season 1, the program team will assign the captain (주장, jujang) of the period in response to the performance of the members of the previous challenge, and the captain will receive an armband. Prior to arriving at the location, members will wear eye masks, and the staff will lead the members to the start point in the large secret room. After fulfilling the instructions of the staff, the members can remove the eye mask. In each challenge, members need to use the clues in the room to gradually explore the large secret room until all members escape from the location.

Each challenge has a different theme, and members will learn about the context of the background story from the clues during the exploration. In addition to finding and cracking the clues, members may need to interact with the story characters played by the staff (such as helping the character, leading the character to escape, etc.) before they can escape from the large secret room. There is no stipulated time limit for each escape challenge, it will only end when all members and story characters (if any) have successfully escaped.

The slogan of the show is "나가야산다", literally meaning 'escape and survive'.

Season 2
A major change being added to the show is that there is a possibility of failure to escape. The recording of the challenge ends once it happens. Another added change is that there is a possibility that cast member(s) would get eliminated in the midst of escaping, based on situations (e.g. "dead" or "missing" during the attempt) and the decisions of the production team. The eliminated cast member(s) will get off from work. There is no longer any assignment of the captain (주장).

Season 3
There is no change in the rules as compare to season 2. Between 12 and 26 April 2020, no new episodes were shown as filming of the show has been postponed due to COVID-19.

Season 4
This season is a Post-Earth adventure.

Cast

Season 1

Season 2

Season 3

Season 4

Episodes

Season 1

Season 2

{|class=wikitable style=text-align:center
! Episode #!! Challenge #!! style=width:15%|Original airdate!! Scene!! Content/Area explored!! Notes
|-
!rowspan=2|1
|
|rowspan=2|17 March 2019
|Team meal meeting
|style=text-align:left|Members meet in advance and are briefed on the new challenge format
|rowspan=3|—
|-
|rowspan=2|1
|rowspan=2|Mirae University(미래대학교)
|style=text-align:left|
1. Gym (체육관)
Wooden Wardrobe
At the basketball court, there is a wooden cabinet with a note "Never to open" (절대열지마시오) and Jong-min was selected to open the cabinet.
As he opened the cabinet, a cabinet full of tennis balls spills out.
Target practice board (mounted on the 2nd floor of the gym)
The cast used the tennis balls from the wooden cabinet to throw through the bulls-eye of target practice board.
P.O succeed in getting a tennis ball through the bulls-eye after a few tries.
2 banners are released to congratulate the cast on the first recording of Season 2 (대탈출2 첫녹화 수고하세요 파이팅).
2. Gym Corridor (체육관 복도)
The cast observed a long stick on the ground. They think it is the high jump pole. They decided to put it aside as it might be useful later.
There is a chained glass door at the end of the corridor. The writings of posters tell the cast that the Gym is off-limit to the students of Mirae University and only men in black suits and those in white gowns are allowed. The cast think it might be linked to UFOs or secret experiments.
The cast also search the metal lockers for hints. A document that was written in the year 2014 was found and the cast thinks that the locker has not been open since then.
Fire hose box
While the cast was searching the place for hints, Ho-dong stumbled upon the empty fire hose box which is suspicious.
P.O pressed the button on the fire hose box and the locked panel next to it opened. A secret flight of stairs is revealed.
3. Basement 1 (지하 1층)

3.1 Conference Room (회의실)
The cast learn from the information on the white board that there a loud bang occurred and the staff in the university tried to keep a secret about the incident.
The cast learn about the secret of Black Tower and history of Secret Security Association (SSA) from the laptop.
Byung-jae found a security access card (with lanyard) on opening of the ventilation shaft.
Initially, the cast thought of jumping on the trampoline to retrieve. Ho-dong suddenly remembered about the long pole found on the Gym Corridor.
Ho-dong rushed back to the Gym Corridor to retrieve the long pole. The remaining cast laugh at Ho-dong as the flag-pole in the Conference Room is long enough to retrieve the access card.
The cast eventually use the long pole from the Gym Hallway to retrieve the access card.
The SSA Visitor access card has an access to B area.

3.2 Branch Manager's room (지부장실)
The cast used the SSA Visitor access card to open the door to the room.
The Branch manager's name is Oh Ji-gu (오지구).
The cast looked at Oh Ji-gu's email inbox for clues/hints. They opened an email titled "RACCOON I" and instructed to download a movie file. The movie file is password protected to be downloaded.
P.O & Byung-jae found a de-cryption security card behind the desk organiser.
Shin-dong decode using the codes on the de-cryption security card and filename of the movie file. He entered "OJIGUMAN" and the movie file started to download.
The movie file is a closed circuit TV recording of the mysterious gas causing the researchers and security guards to die.
After viewing the movie file, the cast look around the room for other clues. Byung-jae exited the room to the Basement 1 hallway and found the hallway with strange black cables from the Control Room (Upper). He return to the room to get the remaining cast to investigate.

Basement 1 Hallway (지하 1층 복도)
The cast found strange cables from the Control Room (Upper) to other rooms. They left the area as they are unable to figure out.

3.3 Cafeteria (식당)
The cast return to the cafeteria and was figuring out on opening the glass door. Shin-dong suddenly remembered that there are magnets on the whiteboard in the Conference Room and retrieved it.
The cast spent some time to lift the bar using the magnets from the glass door. Shin-dong go to the Branch Manager's room to retrieve some papers, folded the papers and finally lift the crossbar.
There is protection vest hanging on the broken glass window and the cast found an SSA Visitor access card with access to C area and the light flare. The protection vest belongs to Guard Jo Geun-man.
The cast also saw a body at the basement 2 of the building. The cast suspected that the person must have jumped out of the window to escape the mysterious gas.
Shin-dong saw the EXIT sign on the basement 2 and guess they will be escaping through there.
The cast had a sumptuous meal at the cafeteria before continuing with the escape.

3.4 Hangar (Upper) (격납고 ((上))
The cast used the SSA Visitor access card with access to C area to open the door. The lighting in the room turned off after a short while and the light flare from the cafeteria comes in handy.
The cast observe there are huge amount of black cables from the hangar door.
P.O manage to find the lighting switch for the hangar and the cast are surprised on their discovery of the Black Tower (검은탑).
|-
!2
|24 March 2019
|style=text-align:left|
3.4a Hangar (Upper) (격납고 ((上))
The cast found the dead researchers at the corner of the hangar. They decided to climb down the ladder to investigate.
As the cast approach the Black Tower (검은탑), a console with Red, Yellow and Blue buttons appear. After a while, a bar timer countdown and the white smoke start to spray out of the Black Tower. The cast escaped the hangar and enter the security room.

3.5a Security Room (보안실)
From the room, the cast see the Black Tower displaying special symbols on the screen via the CCTV.
The cast communicated with the AI robot in the room and manage to learn more about the Black Tower. The Black Tower is a UFO. AI robot warned the cast not to inhale the white smoke from the Black Tower as it has killed all the researchers.
The AI robot informed the cast that after the incident of the white smoke, RACCOON I has been activated. The AI Robot suggested to the cast to visit the Language Lab to learn about the strange symbols.
As the white smoke is deadly, the AI robot informs the cast that the gas protection vests and masks are located in the Storeroom next to the Security Room.
P.O discovered that there is a secret entrance to the storeroom beneath the desk of the room.

3.6 Storeroom (창고)
P.O crawl through the secret entrance and found a dead researcher (유지식). P.O found the access card for Area D.
Byung-jae crawl through the secret entrance to help P.O to find the gas protection vests and masks.

3.5b Security Room (보안실)
Back in the Security Room, AI robot informs that to access the Language Lab, they will need an access card for Area E. Staff with access card for Area E are usually in the Control Room.
The cast put on the gas protection vests and masks so that they can avoid inhaling and in contact with the white smoke.
Jong-min, P.O, Shin-dong and Dong-hyun stayed behind in the room to observe.

3.4b Hangar (Upper) (격납고 ((上))
Ho-dong and Byung-jae visit the Hangar and use sign language to indicate they are safe in the Hangar. After that, they proceed to the Control Room.
Shin-dong and Dong-hyun visited the Hangar and make sketches of the special symbols on the screen of Black Tower and returned to security room.

3.7 Control Room (Upper) 통제실(上)
Ho-dong and Byung-jae enter the room (using access card for Area D) and found a group of dead researchers surrounded by the black cables. They found access card for Area E on Oh Ji-gu (Branch Manager).
After Ho-dong and Byung-jae got the access card for Area E, Oh Ji-gu suddenly woke up as a zombie.
The zombie researchers are unable to follow Ho-dong and Byung-jae as the zombies are restrained by the black cables.

3.5c Security Room (보안실)
The cast gathered back to the security room and Shin-dong explained his findings on the special symbols on the screen of Black Tower.

3.7 Language Lab (언어연구실)
The cast learn the meaning of the alien language via the symbols learned by the researchers.3.4c Hangar (Upper) (격납고 ((上))The cast returned to the hangar and use what they have learned in the language lab.
After the cast enter the appropriate colour code, the door of the Black Tower opened.3.8 Black Tower (검은탑 내실)The cast entered the Black Tower and the door closed.
The cast communicated with the Black Tower.
The cast played a squid game with the Black Tower and succeed.
The Black Tower released the cast by opening the door of the Black Tower.

The alarm started to sound and the cast are given 60 seconds to escape.|-
!3
|rowspan=2|2
|31 March 2019
|rowspan=2|Buam-dong Residence(부암동 저택)
|style=text-align:left|1. Hohyun-dong (회현동)At the parking lot in Hohyun-dong, the cast are separated into 2 groups. 
Jong-min and P.O are brought into a building. They are put into a "prison cell" and being handcuffed and restrained with a long pole in between.
The remaining cast are being led around the parking lot.
A cellphone hanged on the swing started to ring and Byung-jae approached to retrieve. Ho-dong ended up retrieving it as Byung-jae was to short to remove the cellphone from the pouch.
A video conference with a mysterious man revealed that Jong-min and P.O are being kidnapped. The mysterious man showed Ho-dong, Byung-jae, Shin-dong & Dong-hyun a CCTV shot of Jong-min & P.O being put in a prison cell.
The mysterious man instructed Ho-dong, Byung-jae, Shin-dong & Dong-hyun to go to an assigned SUV vehicle and drive to a specific location as shown on the GPS.
The bag in the car has some useful tools that enable them to enter the house.2a. Hohyun-dong prison cell (회현동 감금방)After spending some time removing their blind-fold, Jong-min & P.O looked around the prison cell.
The announcement by the production team that the remaining cast are on their way to rescue Jong-min & P.O.
Jong-min opened the top compartment of the fridge and found a container. It is labelled "Cheetah Snack" (치타 간식) and the content is worms.
The bottom compartment of the fridge was secured with a number lock.
Jong-min & P.O think that the combination to the number lock is located in the "Cheetah Snack" container and try to find it. Eventually, they give up and put the container back to the fridge.3. Travelling on vehicle (차량 이동)Ho-dong, Byung-jae, Shin-dong & Dong-hyun searched the bag in the SUV and found items like dog food, hair-spray, water-spray, a pair of binoculars and envelope with photos of a lady and location of the place they are visiting.
Dong-hyun followed the GPS navigation to the place shown on the photo.4a. Front Door (대문 앞)Dong-hyun drive the SUV and park near to the front door of a mansion.
The mysterious man contacted the cast and instruct them that they are not to enter the mansion till the lady in the photo has left with her car.
After the lady left with her car, the mysterious man contacted the cast and instruct them to enter the mansion cautiously as the place is equipped with security devices.
One of the grills on the main gate can be removed and the cast can climb over the main gate and open the gate easily. Ho-dong climbed over the gate.4.1a Garden (정원)After the cast entered through the main gate, they replace the removed grill to the main gate to prevent suspicion.
The cast used the hair spray and water spray to find and avoid the light beams of the security devices.
Ho-dong lead the cast through the light beams. Byung-jae, Shin-dong & Dong-hyun made fun of Ho-dong as they are able to walk past the light beams without any troubles.2b. Hohyun-dong prison cell (회현동 감금방)Jong-min observed that the cabinet door (outside the prison cell) below the washing basin opened by itself. Jong-min & P.O are terrified.
A henchman enters the scene to check on the prison cell. He sat down for a while before leaving the scene. He returned again with a bowl of food, place it below the washing basin and left the scene.
With the action by the henchman, Jong-min & P.O think that there can be an animal below the washing basin. They place the "Cheetah Snack" container at the prison cell door.4.1b Garden (정원)The cast approach the house cautiously where guard dog is located and found the entrance location to the house.
Ho-dong give the dog some dog food and removed the door key from the dog's collar.5a. 1st floor (1층)The cast entered the house using the door key. There is a pair of shoes after the entrance and the cast think there could be someone inside.
The cast decided to remove their shoes and bring along with them while exploring the house.
Shin-dong examine the tall mirror at the entrance to look for hints.
The cast observed the photos in the 1st floor and deduced that the lady the saw earlier could be the housekeeper. 
Shin-dong observed the clock on the wall is showing 3:41 pm.
The cast decided to hide their shoes in one of the cabinets so that they can search the place easily. They observed that there are mirrors behind the cabinet doors.
The phone on the table ringed and go to the voicemail. It is from the security company and the security company received an intrusion alarm from the house and will be sending some of them to investigate.
The staff of security company showed up at the front gate and entered the Garden. The security staff put the walkie-talkie on the shelf of the entrance.
The cast hides in the toilet behind the shower screen.
The security staff enter the house and search the premise and left after finding nothing unusual.
After the security staff left, the cast continues with their search of the house.
Ho-dong found a room full of food and visited the fridge.
The cast search the study area and found newspaper cuttings about the "Red Eyes Syndrome" (RES).
The cast entered the storage room to search and Byung-jae discovered a suspicious panel behind a rack and decided to investigate. It is found to be an electrical panel box.
The phone on the table ringed and go to the voicemail. The caller did not leave any messages.
The cast looked at the clock on the wall and observed the time on their cellphone does not match. They searched the wall clock and found a key in the battery compartment.
The phone on the table ringed again and go to the voicemail. The caller did not leave any messages.
Shin-dong decided to listen to the voicemail messages of the phone.2c. Hohyun-dong prison cell (회현동 감금방)A raccoon appears from below the washing basin. Jong-min & P.O tried in vain to attract the attention of the raccoon.
Meanwhile, Jong-min & P.O tried to guess the combination to the number lock but to no avail.
Jong-min throw one of the worms from the "Cheetah Snack" container to attract the raccoon.
The henchman entered the room to look at the raccoon. The raccoon ate the worm and Jong-min & P.O presume the raccoon's name is Cheetah.5b. 1st floor (1층)The cast returned to the entrance to the house to look at the tall mirror. They took the mirror from the cabinet where they kept their shoes.
With the help of the mirror from the cabinet, the cast found some scratches on the tall mirror and swiped the scratched. A PUSH sign lit up on the tall mirror.
Byung-jae pushed on the PUSH sign and the tall mirror moved back revealing the 2nd floor. 
|rowspan=2|Kim Jong-min and P.O are "kidnapped", hence the escape challenge will commence with the 4 remaining cast
|-
!4
|7 April 2019
|style=text-align:left|6. 2nd floor (2층)The cast decided to explore the 2nd floor as there is a do not enter sign to the basement.
Byung-jae discovered a 3D printer is printing something. It is printing a staircase.
The cast found an unconscious patient in one of the rooms. The patient is Dr. Baek Shin-yang. 
Before entering the room, they put on the face mask due to the "Red Eyes Syndrome" (RES) they have read about earlier at the 1st floor.
The cast observed that Dr. Baek had put his cellphone and a music box on the shelf.
Ho-dong wanted to explore the cellphone but need Dr. Baek's iris recognition to unlock the phone. After several attempts, the cast succeeds.
The clues in the cellphone shows 4 photos taken in various locations of the basement. 
1. A sketch diagram of a safe
2. Dr. Baek's daughter (Miri) with several paintings
3. Dr. Baek's wife and Miri
4. Dr. Baek and his wife at the bar counter
The cast read the communication from Jeon Dal-shik with Dr. Baek on the "Red Eyes Syndrome" vaccine.
The cast open the music box and there is a photo of Dr. Baek and his family. The music box also played "Fur Elise" melody.
The cast decided to explore the basement as they are unable to find more clues.2d. Hohyun-dong prison cell (회현동 감금방)The raccoon enjoys eating the bowl of worms. 
The henchman left the scene, Jong-min and P.O tried to attract the raccoon but failed. The raccoon return to its hiding place to take a rest.7a. Basement (지하실)While exploring, Ho-dong observed that one of the pictures on the wall is hung upside down. It is the location where Miri's photo is taken with several paintings.
They heard a rattling sound when the picture was flipped. The second key was found in the frame of the painting.
The cast searched around the bar counter for clues to the keys.
Shin-dong played the "Fur Elise" melody on the piano and secret compartment at the back of the bar counter opened. It is the golden safe from the cellphone.2e. Hohyun-dong prison cell (회현동 감금방)The henchman returned to the scene with a bowl of Ramyeon. After finish eating, he returns with 2 bowls of Ramyeon and some rice & kimchi.
Jong-min and P.O managed to complete their meals.8. Miri's Room (미리의 방)Ho-dong used the hair-dryer on the mirror but found nothing. Shin-dong rummaged the toy bear and also found nothing.
Byung-jae was interested in the miniature house next to the bed.
The layout of the miniature house is similar to the mansion. Dong-hyun investigated further and accidentally found the third key.
They are supposed to attach the miniature staircase from the 3D printer to open the secret compartment of the miniature house.
Byung-jae went to the 2nd floor to collect the miniature staircase and the cast discovered it is the staircase for the miniature house.2f. Hohyun-dong prison cell (회현동 감금방)Jong-min and P.O tried to guess the combination for the lock to the fridge.
Meanwhile, the henchman return with a box of domino blocks. The henchman gesture Jong-min and P.O to face away from the prison cell door as he collects the key to the cell door.
After putting the box into the cell, the henchman gives Jong-min and P.O the key to release themselves from the handcuffs and the henchman left the scene. They have to build an 81-storey domino block using all the blocks.
If the complete task, they will be released. They started to build the domino tower using the instruction provided.5c. 1st floor (1층)Byung-jae studied the photo of Miri carefully for any clues in the study room. His observation paid-off as he found a clue on the bookshelf which is "A swallow's nest in a big tree" (큰나무제비집).
At first, the cast did not believe Byung-jae's finding. After finding the 4th key in the swallow's nest, they were surprised.2g. Hohyun-dong prison cell (회현동 감금방)Jong-min and P.O continued with the building of the domino tower.
The henchman enter the scene and took the fishing rod from the shelf on top the basin. He tried to topple the domino tower with the fishing rod as Jong-min and P.O frantically protect it.
The henchman eventually give up and put the fishing rod back to the shelf and left the scene. Jong-min and P.O continued with the building of the domino tower.5d. 1st floor (1층)After finding the 4th key, the cast decided to visit the basement with the 4 keys.
At this moment, the walkie-talkie that is left on the shelf of the entrance sounded and a voice indicated that they are returning to the mansion to retrieve the walkie-talkie. The cast quickly returns to the basement to hide.
Two security staff entered to retrieve the walkie-talkie and found the entrance to the basement.7b. Basement (지하실)The security staff searched the basement. The cast were hiding behind the bar counter.
The security staff left as they are unable to find any abnormalities and found their "lost" walkie-talkie.
The cast insert the 4 keys to the golden safe and the middle of the safe opened with a key appear. The key is for the laboratory.9a. Laboratory (연구실)The cast explored the lab and the laptop for clues. There is only one lab rat alive on the shelf but was not labelled.2h. Hohyun-dong prison cell (회현동 감금방)After a laborious effort to build the domino tower, they decided to give up. Instead, try to get the fishing pole from the shelf.
They linked the two handcuff and poles together, creating a long pole, and try to reach for the fishing pole. After trying for a while, they temporary give up.
They decided to guess the combination for the lock to the fridge and managed to open it. The bottom compartment of the fridge is a bomb with countdown timer.9b. Laboratory (연구실)The video log on the laptop is the journey of Dr. Baek's experiment to develop the vaccine for the "Red Eyes Syndrome" (RES). He has sacrificed 3004 lab rats to develop the vaccine.
In the last video log, Dr. Baek said that Joho Pharmaceuticals and Jo Jae-hak deliberately infected Miri with the "Red Eyes Syndrome" (RES) virus to get Dr. Baek to develop the vaccine. But unfortunately, the virus killed Miri.
Byung-jae summed up the video log and suspect the mysterious man in the video conference is Jo Jae-hak. Jong-min and P.O are captured by Jo Jae-hak.
The cast search the enclosure of the living lab rat but found nothing.
Shin-dong remembered that Dr. Baek had done 3004 experiments and 3 batches (A001-A999, B001-B999 & C001-C999) of lab rats (2997 rats) had died.7c. Basement (지하실)After trying several combination on the golden safe, the cast managed to open the safe using D008 combination. D008 is the answer as the 3005th rat is the successful one.
The safe contains the vaccine and prescription.
The cellphone rang and mysterious man started a video conference with the cast. The mysterious man tells the cast that he is not Jo Jae-hak but one of the many "Red Eyes Syndrome" (RES) victims.2i. Hohyun-dong prison cell (회현동 감금방)Jong-min and P.O frantically try to get the fishing pole after learning the bomb in the fridge. They managed to get the fishing pole and get some keys to open the prison cell.4b. Front Door (대문 앞)The cast exit the house to the front door.
The henchman from the prison cell awaits them to hand over the vaccine and prescription. After verifying the vaccine, the henchman give the cast a black envelope.
The mysterious man had video conference to instruct the cast to solve the riddle in the black envelope while navigating their way back to the Buam-dong apartment.10. On the way back to Hohyun-dong (회현동 가는 길)While in the SUV, Shin-dong & Byung-jae spent their time solving the riddle from the black envelope. It is for the room to the prison cell where Jong-min and P.O are in.
Shin-dong & Byung-jae finally figure out the answer is 709.2j. Hohyun-dong prison cell (회현동 감금방)Ho-dong, Byung-jae, Shin-dong & Dong-hyun found Room 709 and released Jong-min and P.O from the prison cell.|-
!5
|rowspan=2|3
|14 April 2019
|rowspan=2|Mugan Prison(무간 교도소)
|style=text-align:left|1.  Escort (호송)At the parking lot, the cast are being restrained with handcuffs to their waist and escorted up a prison bus.2. Entrance (입소)As the prison bus approached the prison, the cast realised that they are being transported to Mugan Prison.
The cast followed the prison warden to the waiting room.3. New Prisoner Waiting Room (신입자대기실)The cast have to surrender any valuables to the prison warden and is being scanned for any contraband items.
They are given the prison clothing to be worn. A medical examination is performed and mugshot taken for each cast.
Kang Ho-dong (Prisoner number 0414) (Cell 13-하-4)
Kim Jong-min (Prisoner number 0415)(Cell 13-하-5)
Kim Dong-hyun (Prisoner number 0416) (Cell 13-하-4)
Shindong (Prisoner number 0417) (Cell 13-하-4)
Yoo Byung-jae (Prisoner number 0418) (Cell 13-하-5)
P.O (Prisoner number 0419) (Cell 13-하-5)
After the cast have gathered, the prison warden read out their offences. Ho-dong, Byung-jae, Shin-dong & Dong-hyun's offences are trepassing, theft, damage to property and unauthorized collection of personal information while Jong-min & P.O are aiding, abetting and accomplices at Buam-dong robbery.
After the individual interview with the head of security, each cast are given a basket of daily supplies.4. Block 13 (수용 13동)The cast are being transferred to Block 13
Ho-dong, Dong-hyun & Shin-dong are being placed in cell 4 with one existing inmate. The inmate is Seo Myeong-chun (서명춘), one of the 7th member. His offence is fraud
Jong-min, Byung-jae & P.O are placed in cell 5 with 3 existing inmate. One of the inmates is the henchman from the Hohyun-dong prison cell.5a. Room 4 (4번 방)The existing inmate is Seo Myeong-chun (서명춘) (Prisoner number 0842), one of the 7th member. His offence is fraud.
Myeong-chun explains to Ho-dong, Dong-hyun & Shin-dong on the daily schedule at Mugan Prison.
Wake-up at 6:30 am
Breakfast at 7:00 to 8:00 am
Exercise at Yard 8:00 AM to 12:00 pm
Lunch at 12:00 to 12:30 pm
Prison work at 12:30 to 6:00 pm
Dinner are served at 6:00 to 9:00 pm
Lights off at 9:00 pm
Myeong-chun gives information that the chief warden likes to watch fighting matches.
Myeong-chun also gives the cast clues to find Jang Jang-bal (Legendary jail-breaker) who can help them. Jang Jang-bal has a mole with 2 strands of hair below his left eye.
Ho-dong, Dong-hyun & Shin-dong search the room and Myeong-chun to find clues.6a. Room 5 (5번 방)Jong-min, Byung-jae & P.O are being asked to show off their specialities to entertain the existing inmates (Samryoung Gang).
Byung-jae did well to entertain the existing inmates and is given privileges to be served or serve the henchman. Jong-min & P.O are being punished as them did not impress the existing inmates.
While cleaning the room, Jong-min & P.O try to find clues.
Jong-min & P.O are surprised that the existing inmates are able to smuggle a cellphone into the room.7. Detention Block 13 (수용 13동 검방)The prison has a room inspection for Block 13 and all inmates are being asked to line-up at the corridor.
The chief warden (Gu Gyoung-man) chatted with Dong-hyun & Ho-dong as both are well-built.
The prison warden managed to find the cellphone in Room 5. The prison warden transferred the Samryoung Gang inmates out from Room 5 to punishment rooms for 24 hours.6b. Room 5 (5번 방)After the inspection, Jong-min, Byung-jae & P.O started to search the room.
Byung-jae found something attached to the walls in the bathroom. The papers did not yield any clues.8a. Exercise Yard (운동장)It is time for the inmates to exercise and are being brought to the execrise yard.
The cast take the opportunity to find who is Jang Jang-bal. The cast spread out to find Jang Jang-bal.
In the middle of the exercise ground the is a fighting ring. There are 2 inmates wearing head protection gears for a fight match and the cast cannot see if either of them are Jang Jang-bal. The cast encourage Dong-hyun to fight in the match to find out.
Myeong-chun was being transferred to another prison.
The chief warden selected Dong-hyun to fight for one match in the fighting ring.
One of the masked fighter exit the fighting ring and the cast inspected his face for the facial feature of Jang Jang-bal. It turned out not the one they are looking for.
Dong-hyun put on the fighting gear and fight. After Dong-hyun win the fight, the opponent removed his headgear. The opponent does not have the facial feature of Jang Jang-bal.
The chief warden summoned another opponent for Dong-hyun. This inmate has the facial feature of Jang Jang-bal.
|rowspan=2|A robbery has occurred in Buam-dong and the cast are imprisoned for committing the crime. The cast have to find Jang Jang-bal to escape.

|-
!6
|21 April 2019
|style=text-align:left|8b. Exercise Yard (운동장)After the chief warden witness Dong-hyun's fighting capabilities, the chief warden summoned Dong-hyun and informed him that the prison is hosting a fighting match, Mugan FC and would recommend Dong-hyun to enter the fighting match.
Win the fighting match will gain Dong-hyun favours. The chief warden asked Dong-hyun if any request he needed before the match and Dong-hyun asked for Jang Jang-bal's whereabout.5b. Room 4 (4번 방)After exercising, all the cast members are being relocated to Room 4.
After dinner time, a new inmate (Jang Jang-bal) is being allocated to Room 4.
Jang Jang-bal warned the cast on the danger of Mugan FC as the match will only end if one of the inmates dies and suggest that they have to escape from the prison before the fighting match.
Jang Jang-bal removed his underpants from the bathroom to reveal the hidden map of Mugan prison.
Room 4 is used to be his prison cell 2 years prior and he has manipulated the window grill facing the watch tower.
The watch tower search pattern is random and shine on the prison building and compound area. They have to avoid the searchlight by going to the forest and go to the morgue. The morgue is where the dead Mugan FC fighters are stored.
Outsource workers (Yoo Min-sang and Moon Se-yoon) come in monthly to remove the corpses outside. The only way to escape the prison is to be a "corpse" in the morgue.
As there are 4 fighting matches monthly, 4 of the cast have to be the "corpses" and remaining cast have to be the "prison officers". Jang Jang-bal will not escape as he is left with 2 months of imprisonment before being released.
Jang Jang-bal has bribed the outsource workers 2 years prior his failed escape. The cast suggest contacting the outsource workers by using the cellphone from Samryoung Gang and asked Dong-hyun to steal it from the chief warden.
Ho-dong was asked to be out of the room as he has a visitor.9. Reception Room (접견실)Homicide Detective Choi Gang-ryeok is the visitor. As Ho-dong is writing a statement of the robbery at Buam-dong, the detective wrote a secret message and shared with Ho-dong.
The first message says that his brother was a Red Eye Symdrome (RES) patient and Ho-dong has save his brother's life. The detective secretly gave Ho-dong some snacks.
The second message says that he is here to help Ho-dong and get everything they need. Ho-dong wrote down a request for a cellphone and Detective Choi immediately gave Ho-dong secretly.
The third message asked if everyone is safe. Ho-dong's reply was Dong-hyun is in danger due to deadly Mugan FC in the evening.
The fourth message requested Ho-dong to find proof of the illegal activities of Mugan FC before escaping.
The final message wishes Ho-dong and his team a safe escape.5c. Room 4 (4번 방)Ho-dong explain to the cast and Jang Jang-bal about the visitation from Detective Choi.
Jang Jang-bal contacted the outsource workers, using the cellphone from Detective Choi, on the plan to escape the prison.
Byung-jae was thinking about the 2 options on escaping/leaving the prison:
Option 1, is to disguise as corpses to escape as suggested by Jang Jang-bal.
Option 2, finding proof of illegal activities of Mugan FC as requested by Detective Choi.
In the end, the cast agree that they have to get the proof of illegal activities of Mugan FC before escaping the prison in the evening.10a. Laundry Room (세탁실)The inmates of Room 4 are being sent to the laundry room to work in the shed area.
After being put to work in the shed, Ho-dong and Jong-min went to the Inmates' Workspace area to steal 2 sets of security officers uniform.
P.O & Jong-min worn the security officer uniforms beneath their prison clothings.
Dong-hyun was escort to the chief warden's office.11a. Warden's Office (소장실)The chief warden chatted with Dong-hyun on the Mugan FC fight match that will be held in the evening.
The chief warden left the room to receive a phone call. Dong-hyun start to search the room for the proof of illegal activities of Mugan FC as requested by Detective Choi.10b. Laundry Room (세탁실)While sweeping the floor of the laundry room, P.O peeking into the office room and share his findings to the remaining cast.
Shin-dong hold a blanket high to block the view while Byung-jae & Jong-min enter the office room while P.O sweeping the acts as a look-out. At the same time, Ho-dong and Shin-dong will bring the blanket to the exercise yard to dust it off and distract the prison guard.
Byung-jae & Jong-min search the planner on the desk. Byung-jae started collecting clues by taking photos using the cellphone. Byung-jae & Jong-min found the passcodes for the day from the planner. Jong-min stole a walkie-talkie from the office.11b. Warden's Office (소장실)Dong-hyun managed to find the confiscated Samryong Gang's cellphone from the desk's drawer.
Dong-hyun search the desk thoroughly and found 2 USB labelled as the video, client list and betting ledger of Mugan FC. He was not able to see what is in the USB as the chief warden entered the office after answering the phone call.
The chief warden summoned the head of security to the office. The chief warden wants the head of security to keep an eye on Jang Jang-bal as Jang Jang-bal has caused trouble previously.
The chief warden leaves the room to the bathroom and the head of security summoned the prison warden to send Dong-hyun to the laundry room.10c. Laundry Room (세탁실)Byung-jae share with Jong-min the radio codes for different alert levels.
When Dong-hyun returns to the laundry room, the inmates of Room 4 are being sent back to Room 4.5d. Room 4 (4번 방)Dong-hyun displayed the 2 USB and cellphone he has recovered from the warden's office. The Mugan FC fight will be held at 10 p.m.
Jang Jang-bal explains that the lights go out is at 9 p.m. The prison wardens will start setting up Mugan FC and security will become less tight. At 10 p.m. an officer will come and take Dong-hyun for the fight. The cast have to escape before 10 p.m.
The Samryong cellphone has password locked and after several attempt, Ho-dong unlock the phone using the 3-0-2-8 (삼룡이파 - Samryong Gang) code. The cast dialled the phone number that Samryong Gang called earlier, but no one picked up the call.
The cast continued with memorising the radio codes for different alert levels.
During the dinnertime, Byung-jae summorises the things they have gathered from the laundry room and the escape plan/route. They found some flaws in the escape plan and manage to find ways to resolve.
Jang Jang-bal provided the cast with a lock-pick set to open the freezer in the morgue.
Before lights out, Byung-jae again summorises the escape plan/route. They did a practice run of the escape plan.
The cast will get out of the Room 4 one by one and hide behind the big tree.
All the six escapees will proceed to the morgue together.11. Lights Out (소듬)Ho-dong managed to remove the window grill and exit from Room 4. But Ho-dong was caught escaping and Byung-jae was caught unable to put the window grill back in time and the siren sounded.Behind the scene on Yoo Min-sang & Moon Se-yoon practicing in the morgue.
|-
!7
|rowspan=2|4
|28 April 2019
|rowspan=2|Hope Research Laboratory (희망연구소)
|style=text-align:left|1. Deserted Refrigerated Warehouse (폐 냉동창고)Ho-dong, Shin-dong & Jong-min are separated from the Dong-hyun, Byung-jae & P.O and are being housed in separate refrigerated storages. The refrigerated storages are in pitched darkness and the cast have to search the place for light source.
Byung-jae and Jong-min found some lighters on the floor but these lighters are faulty (missing flint).
Jong-min managed to find a bunch of keys on the floor. Ho-dong, Shin-dong & Jong-min exited their refrigerated storage and advised the other cast on finding the keys in their refrigerated storage.
After Dong-hyun, Byung-jae & P.O, found the keys and exited their refrigerated storage. Both groups realised that the objects on the floor in refrigerated storages are human skeleton remains.2. Kitchen Storage (주방 창고)Shin-dong looked at the place briefly and observed a telephone on the floor and some food storages spilled on the floor.
After all the cast escaped from the refrigerated storage, they continue to search the place.
There is a padlocked door that may lead to other places.
Byung-jae found some spray-painted writing on the wall, behind a rack. The writing says "우리에겐아직희망이있다" (We still have hope).
Byung-jae observed that there are dead mice on the lighting board above. With the help of Dong-hyun, Byung-jae was lifted up and found a key among the dead mice.
The cast use the key and open the padlocked door.3. Kitchen (주방)The kitchen is messy with bloodstains and overturned racks. A sliding door with number-lock is in front of the freezer.
Jong-min and P.O peeked into a freezer and were terrified due to a burnt body in the freezer. On the burnt body, the cast found a ring on one of the fingers.
P.O tried to open an exit door next to the freezer and found a zombie. This causes all cast to dash to the Kitchen Storage.
The zombie broke through the bottom of the door with the right hand sticking out. The zombie is wearing a watch and the time shown on the watch is quarter part three. The cast try to use 3-1-5 to unlock the sliding door with number-lock but failed.
Byung-jae, Shin-dong and Ho-dong restrain the zombie's hand to remove the watch.
The cast observed that the watch is a smartwatch and used Bluetooth to pair to find a cellphone. The cellphone is suspect to be in the other room, behind the sliding door.
After removing the ring from the burnt body from the freezer, the cast see an inscription on the ring, "MSG".
Shin-dong remembers seeing a telephone in the Kitchen Storage and retrieve the telephone. Using the keypad on the telephone, the cast manage to get decipher the "MSG" → 6-7-4.
After unscrambling the number-lock, the cast return to Kitchen Storage to take a snack break.
The cast have to solve the block puzzle behind the sliding door. After Jong-min solved the block puzzle, the cast enter to another area.4. Cafeteria (식당)After entering to the cafeteria, the cast used the smartwatch to Bluetooth pair to find a cellphone. The cellphone was found on the tray return rack.
The cellphone belongs to Hanshik (the chef, zombie behind the Kitchen Exit door). The chef's girlfriend is Byungsil.
The cast walked along the corridor with many doors. Suddenly a zombie appeared from the last door of the corridor and the cast dashed back to the Cafeteria. The zombie was being chained to the room.
Byung-jae searched the corridor alone and opened one of the door. Byung-jae took all 6 walkie-talkies and the second zombie appeared. Byung-jae dashed back to the Cafeteria. The second is also chained to her room.
After checking that the walkie-talkies are working, Byung-jae again starts to search the corridor.
Near the second zombie, Byung-jae found an exit door with six latch locks.
After exiting the corridor, the cast rushed to the van.5a. Officer's Barrack (장교 막사)The cast realise that they cannot escape the place that easily and decide to visit the Officer's Barrack. The Officer's Barrack is where Byungsil stays.
The cast searched the barrack for clues. Dong-hyun searched the bathroom and a chained zombie (Byungsil) appeared. The cast dashed out of the Officer's Barrack.
The cast re-enter the barrack and searched for clues. The cast learnt more about the PDS (Paritally Deceased Sydrome) virus in a diary and learnt a human named Hope is the vaccine. Further reading found to have linked story to "Lung Hospital" in Season 1, episode 3 & 4 (Dr. Lee Byung-won). Dr. Lee Byung-won is elder brother of Byungsil. Byung-jae found an access card in the diary.
As the area is protected with the electric fence, the only way to exit the place is to drive the van through the gate.
Jong-min observed an envelope on the desk of the bathroom. P.O open the closet to see if any zombies or Hope is in the closet.
After retrieving the envelope, the cast read the message. It is the final report of "Last Project Hope". The vaccine is Hope Choi who is 9 years old. The zombie will not attack Hope Choi but Hope will not last long by himself and Hope is located in the Laboratory's Isolation room.
Byung-jae searched the closet and found the laboratory key in one of the items of clothing.6. Laboratory (연구실) Using the laboratory key, Byung-jae opened the door to the laboratory.
From the TV monitor, the cast were able to see what is happening in the Isolation room in night vision. The zombies are surrounding the bed in the Isolation room.
|rowspan=2|
|-
!8
|5 May 2019
|style=text-align:left|6. Laboratory (연구실)The cast learnt from the whiteboard that the Zombie are weak in eyesight, and will be in a trance in dark places, but show specific reaction to specific sounds. The Zombie reacts strongly to fireworks and bright light.
On the whiteboard for the emergency response plan, the cast found where the car key storage box is located is the control room.
Emergency key storage boxes are located are the Lab and Isolation Room. There are no keys in the Lab and the cast have to retrieve the keys from the Isolation Room.
Byung-jae scanned the card from the diary (from Officer's Barrack) to the door for the Isolation Room. The panel displayed a 6×6 row of various colours and at the end of the sequences, the panel will appear the colour blocks to be selected.
After completing the colour puzzle, the door to Isolation Room opened.7. Isolation Room (격리실)On the corridor, there is a kid's backpack on the floor that belongs to Hope Choi. Byung-jae gathes the contents of the spill on the floor and the backpack and explore further. The corridor is dark and the gate to the Isolation Room is not pad-locked but secured by a latch.
The contents in the backpack include some crayons and a night vision camcorder. Use the night vision camcorder, the cast are able to see some zombies in the Isolation Room.
As the camcorder can only film the Isolation Room partially, the cast go to the TV monitor in the Lab to see where Byung-jae was filming from.
Byung-jae also discovered that the Emergency key storage box is located on the left wall of the Isolation Room.
Jong-min & P.O quietly entered the Isolation Room with the camcorder while the rest of the cast will direct Jong-min & P.O using the walkie-talkie (from the Cafeteria) via the TV monitor. As the room is full of zombies, Jong-min & P.O have to walk carefully to avoid physical contact with zombies.
After Jong-min & P.O retrieved 2 keys from the Emergency key storage box, the lights in the Isolation Room turned on. They quickly escape from the room with the remaining cast and also quickly leave the Lab and head for the Control Room as the zombies are chasing them.8a. Control Room (통제실)All the cast managed to reach the staircase of the Control Room and close/lock the gate. The zombies congregated at the locked gate of the staircase.
3rd floor
The keys from the Isolation Room can only open the door for the 3rd floor of Control Room. In the room, there is a GPS tracker on where Hope is located, lab coat of Lee Byung-sil and fireworks ignition switchbox.
Dong-hyun searched the lab coat of Lee Byung-sil and found a collection of keys to the facilities of Hope Institute. The keys available to the cast are the fireworks ignition switchbox, pantry and desk drawer (Officer's Barrack).
The fireworks ignition switchbox can only be used for three times to distract the zombies.
Shin-dong also found a microphone and Bluetooth speaker in the room.
After some discussion:-
 P.O will stay in the Control Room to activate the fireworks' ignition to distract the zombies.
 Ho-dong will go to the Officer's Barrack.
 Dong-hyun & Byung-jae will go to the Pantry to get Hope Choi.
 Jong-min & Shin-dong will use the microphone and Bluetooth speaker
P.O flick the first firework ignition and the firework display distracted the zombies away from the staircase. Ho-dong, Dong-hyun & Byung-jae run to the Officer's barrack and Pantry. Jong-min guard the door of the staircase and Shin-dong place the Bluetooth speaker behind the building and return to the staircase.9. Pantry (식료품 창고)Dong-hyun & Byung-jae safely reached the Pantry to find Hope.
Hope is being locked in a cage. Hope is very wary of Dong-hyun & Byung-jae.
After part of the "Baby Shark" melody was broadcast on the walkie-talkie, Dong-hyun & Byung-jae use the song to gain Hope's trust.
Hope gave Byung-jae the key to the cage to unlock. Dong-hyun & Byung-jae have the same situation with Ho-dong with zombies out the door.5b. Officer's Barrack (장교 막사)Ho-dong safely reached the Officer's Barrack and quickly secure the door. Ho-dong unlocks the drawer and found a cellphone and 2nd floor Control Room key. The cellphone contains a video of Hope and Hope's favourite song, "Baby Shark".
As Ho-dong was about exit the barrack, he discovered that there are zombies surrounding the door.8b. Control Room (통제실)When Ho-dong, Dong-hyun & Byung-jae are ready to return to the Control Room, P.O flick 2nd firework ignition. It failed to ignite. The 3rd firework iginition worked and the zombies are again distracted.
Ho-dong, Hope, Dong-hyun & Byung-jae quickly run to the Control Room. Hope, Dong-hyun & Byung-jae safely return to Control Room
Ho-dong was unable to safely return to the Control Room before the firework end and was attacked by the zombie. Before he became a zombie, he frantically hands over the cellphone and key to Byung-jae & Shin-dong.
2nd floor
After getting the car key from the 2nd floor, the telephone in the room rang.
A personnel from the Central Disaster Control headquarter informing the cast the facility will be blown up within 70 minutes as it was deemed as a threat due to the virus spreading in the Lab. The cast can only escape from the facility using the van and exit by crashing through the gate. As the cast have used up the fireworks to distract the zombie, they request for a recorder.
3rd floor
The remaining cast discuss on the escaping plan:-
 Shin-dong will play the recorder into the microphone and the Bluetooth speaker will distract the zombies.
 Byung-jae will retrieve the Bluetooth speaker and lure the zombies to the 3rd floor of Control Room. After all the zombies have enter the room, he will leave the room and lock the door.
 Hope and the remaining cast will run to the van and Dong-hyun will drive the van.
After a long wait, a drone that carried the recorder arrived.
Shin-dong practice the melody to be played on the recorder. The melody played did distract the zombies to the Bluetooth speaker.
Byung-jae waits at the staircase while the remaining cast and Hope hide in the 2nd-floor room.
As the zombies are distracted by the melody on the Bluetooth speaker, Shin-dong, P.O, Dong-hyun & Hope exited the Control Room. Byung-jae retrieves the Bluetooth speaker and lure the zombies to the 3rd floor of Control Room.
With the zombies locked on the 3rd floor, Byung-jae exited the Control Room and Jong-min locked the door to the staircase from outside.
When Shin-dong stops playing the recorder, the zombies exited from the 3rd floor and to the 1st floor.
Hope, Shin-dong, P.O, Dong-hyun, Byung-jae & Jong-min run to the van and break through the gate.|-
!9
|rowspan=2|5
|12 May 2019
|rowspan=2|St. Matthew Jo's Psychiatric Hospital(조마테오 정신병원)
|style=text-align:left|1. Admission (입원)The cast took an elevator to the 6th floor of the building.
At the corridor of the 6th floor, the cast are separated into 3 rooms.
Ho-dong & Shin-dong (Room 601) - 3 bedded room
P.O & Byung-jae (Room 603) - 3 bedded room
Dong-hyun & Jong-min (Room 605) - 2 bedded room
After removing their blind-fold, one nurse of each room enter the rooms to give instructions. The cast are to change to hospital gown and are not allow to exit the room except for break time.2a. Room 601 (601호)Room-mate for Ho-dong & Shin-dong is Choi Da-joong. After communicating with Da-joong, Ho-dong realises that they are in a psychiatric hospital.
The fridge in the room is number-locked, Ho-dong & Shin-dong has to figure out the clue pasted on the fridge door.3a. Room 603 (603호)While finding clues in the room, Byung-jae saw his basket of clothing moving. Their room-mate (Um Dae-do) is hiding under the bed.
Um Dae-do has the habit of stealing things.
P.O & Byung-jae receive a Chinese chess King piece after showing their talent to Um Dae-do. Dae-do also give them a phonecard.4a. Room 605 (605호)While searching the room, Dong-hyun & Jong-min heard a thud sound from the cupboard. It is the sound of flashlight falling down.
They realise the flashlight is not ordinary as it is the infrared type.
They shine the flashlight to one of the wall and found a hidden message. "Do not trust Dr. Jo Mateo".
The message of "Do not trust Dr. Jo Mateo" makes Dong-hyun think that the Dr. Jo Mateo is a bad doctor and the patient in the hospital are normal people.3b. Room 603 (603호)P.O found a box under Um Dae-do's bed and Um Dae-do quickly take it back saying it is from his mum.
Dae-do become angry and hide under his bed protecting his box. P.O & Byung-jae are curious in the contents of the box and Dae-do finally came out of his hiding after P.O & Byung-jae agree not to touch the box.2b. Room 601 (601호)After solving the puzzle Ho-dong & Shin-dong, they open the fridge door and find a jar of origami cranes, a photo and an envelope.
The photo shows a nurse and envelope is a birthday card to the nurse (Mija) and the jar of 301 origami cranes is for Mija.
Shin-dong observe something (clue) is in the jar and decided to pour out all the contents from the jar.
Ho-dong & Shin-dong put the pieces of paper together and is the patient chart of Jang Gi-du. It is written that Jang Gi-du has been completely cured.5. Doctor Rounds (회진)Room 601
Dr. Jo and 2 nurses enter the room to do the rounds.
Ho-dong's medical condition is compulsive over-eating. Dr. Jo's diagnosis is Ho-dong is ill due to unable to control himself and eating too much. Dr. Jo tells the nurses that Ho-dong has to fast without food for 24 hours.
Shin-dong's medical condition is impulsive kleptomania (inability to refrain from the urge for stealing items). Dr. Jo diagnosis is Shin-dong is ill and will be put in observation.
Choi Da-joong show some origami to Mija, one of the nurses. Ho-dong & Shin-dong now know who Mija is.
After Dr. Jo and 2 nurses left the room, Choi Da-joong tells Ho-dong & Shin-dong that there is a special treatment unit in the 5th floor and Dr. Jo takes patients there to do weird experiments. Choi Da-joong also warn them not to swallow any pills given by the nurses as the pills will make you sleepy.
Room 603
Byung-jae's medical condition is oppositional defiant disorder, commonly known as eighth grade syndrome. Dr. Jo diagnosis is Byung-jae is in bad condition and will be put in observation.
P.O's medical condition is emotionally deprived and touch people a lot. Dr. Jo diagnosis is P.O is ill since he like to touch people a lot.
Um Dae-do feels anxious when Dr. Jo was talking to him. Mija ask P.O & Byung-jae if they see a box Um Dae-do has stolen. One of the nurses search the bed found the box under Um Dae-do's bed. The box contain an access card, calculator and a pair of straw shoes.
The box was confiscated and Dr. Jo request for a change in medical prescription since Um Dae-do's condition has worsen.
Room 605
Dong-hyun's medical condition is mythomania (pathological tendency to exaggerate). Dr. Jo diagnosis is Dong-hyun is ill.
Jong-min's medical condition is dyslexia. Jong-min has some difficulty reading the tongue-twisting phrase given by Dr. Jo. Dr. Jo diagnosis is Jong-min is very ill and will be put in observation.
As the doctor rounds comes to the end, Dr. Jo suddenly examines Jong-min.
After the doctor rounds, all the patients are allowed to exit their room and go for their break time.6. Break Room (휴게실)Dong-hyun & Jong-min tell the remaining cast on their findings in their room of hidden message, "Do not trust Dr. Jo Mateo" using the infrared flashlight.
P.O & Byung-jae also tell the remaining cast that they receive a Chinese chess King piece from Um Dae-do and phonecard. Byung-jae reveal that Um Dae-do has a box with access card, calculator and a pair of straw shoes but is confiscated by the nurse (Mija).
Ho-dong & Shin-dong share with the remaining cast that they found a patient chart of Jang Gi-du. Dr. Jo seems to be doing weird experiments on the 5th floor and not to swallow any pills given by the nurse.
While the cast are discussing, an elderly man is staring at them and it turns out to by the History teacher (Ge Su-sang) of the Tae-yang High School (Season 1 episode 11–12). Ge Su-sang has gone insane.
The cast move to a man playing the Chinese chess, but is missing the King piece. After giving the King piece to the man, the cast start to help the man to figure out the final move.
While the cast is figuring out the final move on the Chinese chess, Shin-dong & byung-jae look around the place for other clues.
Jong-min finally solves the Chinese chess game, the man finally reveal that he is Jang Gi-du.
Jang Gi-du warn the cast not to trust anyone in the hospital and there is a special treatment unit that is next to Dr. Jo's office on the 5th floor.
Jang Gi-du give more information of a suspicious patient who committed murder to 3 of his friends and was admitted here a year ago. This patient was diagnosed with schizophrenia and may harm anyone.
A bleeding man appear in the corridor walking into the Break Room. This cause one of the nurses to scream and Mija ordered the male nurses to escort the bleeding patient to the basement.
With the chaos occurred, Mija ordered all the patients to return to their rooms.7. Taking Medication (약 복용)The cast returned to their room and were talking about what has happened in the Break Room.
P.O tell Byung-jae that he saw the confiscated box in the nurses' office.
The nurses visited the rooms to administer the medication. The cast put the pills in their mouth and drink the water, they pretend to swallow the pills and spit the pills out as the nurses are not looking.
After administering the medication, several male nurses enter Room 605 to drag Jong-min out of the room. Mija informs Jong-min that Dr. Jo wants him in the special treatment unit.
The nurses and Jong-min go to the Basement via the staircases and the path to the 5th floor is with bloody footsteps.
An emergency call was addressed to all male nurses to proceed to the Basement. This means no one is in the corridor. The remaining cast exited their room and Dong-hyun inform the cast that Jong-min has been drag out of his room.8. Nurse Office (간호사실)P.O quickly enter the nurses' office. The box P.O is looking for is not longer on the desk.
The cast looked for Kim Mija's locker and Ho-dong entered 0-3-0-1 to unlock the locker. The password is Mija's birthdate, the clue is from the envelope in his room.
The box P.O is looking for is in the locker. The took the access card and put the box back to the locker.
The cast use the access card to open the door to the staircase.9a. Basement (지하실)Jong-min is being dragged to the Basement by 2 male nurses. After putting Jong-min into a room, the nurses locked the door and left.
Dr. Jo appear in the room and reveal that he is also an exorcist and there is an evil spirit in the hospital. Dr. Jo needs Jong-min's help to defeat the evil spirit.
Dr. Jo teaches Jong-min the prayer to defeat the evil spirit.10a. 5th Floor (5층 병동)The cast follow the bloody footsteps to Room 503. It is Wang Hee-yeol's room.
They quickly return to the staircase after knowing the room belongs to the murderer, Wang Hee-yeol. They return to the room and found the room to be empty.
Ho-dong bravely enters the room and see 3 words written on the wall, Chun Hae-myeong (天海明).9b. Basement (지하실)After Jong-min is able to remember the prayer, Dr. Jo bring Jong-min to place to defeat the evil spirit.
Wang Hee-yeol was tied to a bed.
|rowspan=2|
|-
!10
|19 May 2019
|style=text-align:left|11. Room 503 (503호)Ho-dong remembered the late exorcist Chun Hae-myeong from Season 1. 4 students went missing. One of the students killed the other 3 and got admitted to this hospital. The cast think that the evil spirit of Chun Hae-myeong has possessed on Wang Hee-yeol.
Byung-jae search the closet and found a backpack. The content in the backpack includes a shirt and a photo of the 4 missing students.9c. Basement (지하실)Jong-min and Dr. Jo continue to expel the evil spirit from Wang Hee-yeol's body. As the prayer did not work, Dr. Jo locked Jong-min in a small room for safety. Dr. Jo continue to expel the evil spirit using the prayer. After a short while, the Basement became quiet. Dr. Jo has sacrificed his life trying to expel the evil spirit.10b. 5th Floor (5층 병동)After leaving Room 503, the cast approach the Special Treatment Unit. They tried to enter the room but the door was locked. Instead, they decided to go to Dr. Jo's office to investigate.11. Director's Office (원장실)On the desk, the cast look for clues on the Dr. Jo's journal and Wang Hee-yeol's patient chart.
The cast learnt that Wang Hee-yeol did not go to prison but was admitted to the hospital as he committed a crime while he was possessed.
The possessed body gives a rotten stench and anyone smelling the stench for 10 minutes will die.
There are 4 steps to expel the evil spirit.
The person needs to be tied up.
Recite the prayer to expel the spirit.
Perform the ritual to expel the spirit from the body.
End of the ritual as the evil spirit is separated from the body.
The cast also learnt about the history of the 4 missing students and the prayer to expel the evil spirit.
The lighting in the room suddenly went out and when the lighting came back, Byung-jae thinking that he heard a voice during the blackout. The lighting in the room will continue to go out regularly and voice will be heard.
The cast use the infrared flashlight to shine on the paintings on the wall when the lights went out, but there was no clues.
After spending sometimes listening to the voice, P.O conclude that the voice is pointing to the crucifixes (십자가) in the room. They finally found a key in one of the crucifixes.
The cast removes the procedures to expel the spirit for the journal.12a. Locked Room (밀실)Jong-min is being locked in the room with wall covered with bible pages.
Jong-min tried to find clues from the bible pages but found none.10c. 5th Floor (5층 병동)After getting the key from the Director's Office, the cast decided to investigate the Special Treatment Unit.
The key from Director's Office opened the door for Special Treatment Unit.13. Special Treatment Unit (특수치료실)Under the table of sacred things, there is an empty backpack.
A TV monitor showed a hospital patient tied to a bed. The cast think it is Jong-min. Next to the TV monitor is a key to the Basement.
Byung-jae read the steps of expelling the evil spirit and found that reciting the prayer and perform ritual is important while tying the person and end of the ritual is not important.
The cast need a sacred thing for the ritual. There are several cans of garlic and garlic mixtures on the table. They decided to take all the cans garlics and mixtures using the empty backpack.
On the wall, the cast found as a similar prayer to expel the possessed body with some different words used.10d. 5th Floor (5층 병동)As the cast enter the staircase, a female voice asking for help. The out of order elevator door suddenly opened, which scared the cast. The elevator is lit with eerie red lights.
The cast looked at the procedures to expel the spirit to understand the steps better and in case they need it to counter the female voice asking for help in the elevator.14. Broken Elevator (고장 난 엘리베이터)As the cast enter the elevator, Shin-dong discovered that there is no button for the Basement.
The TV monitor in the elevator lights up and shows the picture of the 4 missing students. The voices from the picture pleaded to save Wang Hee-yeol and Hee-yeol did not kill the 3 students, but is Chun Hae-myeong.
After the cast understand the situation, the eerie red lights went off and something popped out outside the elevator. 3 pieces of frame keys are in the small bag that popped out.9d. Basement (지하실)The cast walked down the staircase to the Basement.
After entering the Basement, a locked door was in their way. Byung-jae used the key from the Special Treatment Unit to unlock the door.
The cast searched the lockers to find more clues. As they approach the Locked Room (where Jong-min is imprisoned), the rattling sound from the room cause the cast to flee.
The cast approached the Locked Room and Jong-min shouted the cast to open the door and the person tied to the bed is the demon. The opened door suddenly closed.
After the cast opened the door to the Locked Room, they found Jong-min and entered the Locked Room.12b. Locked Room (밀실)Jong-min explained to the cast on what has happened during the exorcism. The cast discovered that there are 3 versions of the prayers: Demon, Devil & Evil spirit.
The bed suddenly lifted and blood start to spew from the ceiling along the walls. Byung-jae used the 3 versions of the prayers but to no effect.
After witnessing the power of Chun Hae-myeong, the cast quickly close the door due to the deadly smoke.
P.O used the infrared flashlight to shine on the bible on the wall and found a clue. After switching off the light of the room, they found the clue that says, "Paint a cross between the eyes with red garlic seasoning".
The cast looked at the procedures to expel the spirit. Since the 3 versions of the prayers do not have any effect, Shin-dong suggested to use Chun Hae-myeong instead. The reason Dr. Jo failed is he did not know which spirit possessed Wang Hee-yeol.
The cast decided to chant the prayers together using Demon, Devil, Evil spirit & Chun Hae-myeong. The prayer version with Chun Hae-myeong has the affect to weakened the powers of the possessed body and spirit of Chun Hae-myeong is in agony.
Byung-jae tried to applied the garlic seasoning on the possessed body but failed because he was too short to reach the forehead. Dong-hyun bravely applied the garlic seasoning to expel the evil spirit.
After the evil spirit separated from the body, the bed was lowered. The cast slowly approach the bed to untie Wang Hee-yeol.
Jong-min found a wheelchair in the elevator and bring to the cast to transport Wang Hee-yeol.13. Elevator (엘리베이터)Jong-min discovered a puzzle in the terminal box that need the frame key.
After the cast and Wang Hee-yeol entered the elevator, the door of the elevator closed.
The cast has 10 minutes to solve the puzzle as the spirit without the body will produce stench smell. Anyone who smells it for 10 minutes will die.
Byung-jae found a clue on the shirt of Wang Hee-yeol.
After placing the 3 frame keys to the correct slots, the elevator moved to the 1st floor and the elevator door opened.|-
!11
|rowspan=2|6
|26 May 2019
|rowspan=2|Murder Prison(살인감옥)
|style=text-align:left|1. Prison Cell (감금방)The cast are being escorted to a building corridor with many rooms and are separated into 3 rooms.
Shin-dong & Dong-hyun (Room 301)
Jong-min & Byung-jae (Room 302)
Ho-dong & P.O (Room 303)
Each cast is being sat to a wooden chair and bounded with their limbs and upper torso to their chair.
A masked man with a large sledgehammer enters the corridor. He enter the 3 rooms and do a body search of the cast. After removing the blindfolds, he takes a polaroid picture of each cast and exit the room.
The masked man entered Room 305 and wheeled detective out of the room to another room within the corridor. After some pleading from the detective, the detective was silenced.
Meanwhile, Shin-dong & Dong-hyun managed to shift the wooden chair to be next to each other and free themselves from the wooden chair.
The sound of the hitting the detective and chainsaw scares the cast.
After a while, the masked man headed towards the exit with 2 black plastic bags. The exit door is secured with special numbered dials and after putting in the codes, he exit corridor. The exit door has a small bell that will ring when the door is closed.
Ho-dong & P.O also managed to free themselves from the wooden chair. This is follow by Jong-min & Byung-jae.
the cast tried to guess the passcode to open their door but was unsuccessful.
Byung-jae used the passcode of Room 305 and managed to cracked passcode for his and other rooms. The solution is prime factorization.2a. Corridor (복도)The cast tried to solve the passocde for Room 306, but failed. In the end, the cast entered Room 305 to look for clues. There was no clues in the room except for one wooden chair.
The cast approach the exit door and discovered that there are 20 dials on the iron door. Byung-jae explained to the cast that the masked man exit the corridor via this exit door as he heard the bell rang as the door closed.3. Workroom (작업실)The cast entered the workroom and found the wooden chair the detective was sitting on and found a clue engraved to the right arm rest of the chair. The engravement is "radio".
P.O found a cassette player on the shelf and played the tape. The content on the tape is about a Korean comedy based on the American duo, but did not yield any clues.
While the cast search all the rooms and corridor for clues, P.O was curious with the wooden chest with drawers. All the cast start to investigate and managed to find a key in one of the drawers.
The key opens one of the doors in the corridor.4. Storage Room (창고)The room is unique as there are tools on the 3 sides of the wall and small pots of flowers on the shelves on one side of the room.
One of the plants is labelled "Handle". After removing the flowers pot from the shelf, the cast found a door handle hidden behind the flower pot.
After opening the door, the cast found another key on the back of the door. They also found the photos taken of themselves and many victims.
The photos are separated into 2 sections, one sections are victims that are dead while the other sections are victims that are alive. They also found their blindfolds, pocketbook, handcuff and a radio (walkie-talkie) in the plastic bag.
The pocketbook belongs to Detective Choi Hyungsoo of Panju Police Homicide Team 2.
The writing on the pocketbook indicate that the radio was thought to be broken but he received a message. The man in the radio says he's Detective Kim but Detective Kim is sleeping in the night duty room. The cast suspect that Detective Choi was talking to Detective Kim of the future. The message that Detective Choi received is the future at one week later. The message is similar to the drama show "Signal". Detective Choi also write about the parallel universe in the pocketbook.
The radio is also able to reach with the past. Detective Choi talked to Detective Lee who lived in 1999.
There have been 10 missing people report in Paju and Detective Choi thinks these are not simple missing people cases. These missing people had either met or knew a man named Park Kang-in.
Detective Kim from the other world contacted Detective Choi that the other Detective Choi has been missing since 29 April 2019.
Detective Kim from the other world said the missing persons cases will be charged to a serial murder case on 6 May and Park Kang-in was arrested as the murder suspect. This is the last entry to the pocketbook.
The cast tried to use radio to communicate but was unsuccessful.5. Secret Room (밀실)The cast use the key from the Storage Room to enter the room at the end of the corridor.
The wall is filled with mathematical questions and a keyhole on the wall.
After Byung-jae insert the key to the keyhole on the wall, the door closed and floor start to rise. The floor stopped rising after a while.
Shin-dong found an air vent on the wall. P.O remove the grill of the air vent and found a passcode key pad. The clue is "NO HIT NO RUN".
While the cast was thinking of the clue, P.O played with the radio and got a response. The date of the parallel universe is 29 June 2019, 6.26pm. Lee Jang-won is the person that response to the radio call.
|rowspan=2|
|-
!12
|2 June 2019
|style=text-align:left|6. 29 June Paju (6월29일 파주)Opening scene with Lee Jang-won, Kim Ji-seok & Ha Seok-jin gathered at Paju. They are transported to the Prison Cell with the blindfolds.7. Room 306 (306호)After removing their blindfolds, Lee Jang-won, Kim Ji-seok & Ha Seok-jin tried to look for clues in the room but found nothing.
They spent two and a half hours (3:21pm to 5:52pm) to finally find the passcode to open their cell door.8a. Corridor (복도)There is a namecard of Kim Jun Ho of Paju Police Station on the phone booth.
Near the phone booth, a document on "Report on the murder case" and laptop were placed on a table.
They are unable to turn on the laptop as the is no electrical outlet near them.9a. Workroom (작업실)Lee Jang-won, Kim Ji-seok & Ha Seok-jin entered the room to look for clues.
Kim Ji-seok found the "Pull during emergency" on the wall and pulled it. Two white jet of powder sprayed from the wall.
They found a roll of extension cord in the Workroom but was still unable to power on the laptop as the is no electrical outlet to be found.10. Room 304 (304호)Ha Seok-jin push open the door and enter. It was previously locked in episode 11.
The wall is pasted with old newspaper cuttings on baseball. In the centre of the room, there is a chair and the typewriter placed on a wooden table.9b. Workroom (작업실)Lee Jang-won, Kim Ji-seok & Ha Seok-jin searched the room again and were curious with the wooden chest with drawers. They start to investigate and managed to find a key in one of the drawers.11. Storage Room (창고)Lee Jang-won, Kim Ji-seok & Ha Seok-jin entered the room using the key from Workroom.
They found the handle to the secret door after removing the flower pot labelled "Handle".
After opening the door, they found another key on the back of the door. They also found the photos taken of many victims. They decided to take all the items on the shelf to investigate.8b. Corridor (복도)Kim Ji-seok carried the backpack to Room 304 to investigate and found some soda drinks and snacks. He enjoyed the soda drink and snack while Ha Seok-jin found the radio and turn it on.
P.O was transmitting the clue from the Secret Room, "No hit, no run" and Ha Seok-jin & Lee Jang-won heard it.
Ha Seok-jin replied to P.O that Lee Jang-won, Kim Ji-seok & Ha Seok-jin are present in the parallel universe.
Lee Jang-won tell the cast they had escaped from Room 306 and what the passcode was.
Ha Seok-jin read the document on "Report on the murder case" further and found that the cast were victims of the murder case.
Byung-jae and Ho-dong give instructions to Kim Ji-seok & Ha Seok-jin to get to the door at the end of the corridor. It seems that the wall at the end of the corridor is hiding the door.
After searching around, Kim Ji-seok & Ha Seok-jin found a switch behind the emegency exit signal. After setting the switch, the wall moved backward to reveal the door.
After entering the Secret Room, Kim Ji-seok found an electrical outlet on the wall. They connect the power outlet to the laptop via the extension cord.
Ho-dong reminded Lee Jang-won, Kim Ji-seok & Ha Seok-jin not to insert and turn the key in the Secret Room as they will have the same outcome as the cast.
After turning on the laptop, a password is required to enter to the laptop.11. NO HIT NO RUNThe cast's guide Lee Jang-won, Kim Ji-seok & Ha Seok-jin to the air vent in the Secret Room.
Lee Jang-won, Kim Ji-seok & Ha Seok-jin have to solve the equations correspond to the letter of "NO HIT NO RUN" for the password to the keypad of the air vent.
After Lee Jang-won, Kim Ji-seok & Ha Seok-jin gave the correct passcode to the cast to enter for the password to the keypad of the air vent, the floor start to lower and the door opened.8c. Corridor (복도)Lee Jang-won, Kim Ji-seok & Ha Seok-jin were still unable to guess the password for the laptop. After using the numbers from the namecard of Kim Jun Ho, they managed to unlock the laptop.
They open the interview video of Park Kang-in profiling.2b. Corridor (복도)The cast escaped from the Secret Room and is now at the phone booth. The 20 dials on iron door of the exit door resembles the scoreboard of a baseball game.
After entering the passcode to the phone booth, the door to Room 304 opened.12. Room 304 (304호)The wall is pasted with old newspaper cuttings of baseball. In the centre of the room, there is a chair and the typewriter placed on a wooden table. There is a letter on the table.
There is also a baseball line-up card that is on the table. The RF section is empty.
Byung-jae relay the baseball line-up card to Lee Jang-won, Kim Ji-seok & Ha Seok-jin.
After reviewing the interview video again, Lee Jang-won & Kim Ji-seok thinking that the answer is Park In-gang (Park Kang-in's father). Ha Seok-jin relay the answer via the radio to the cast. After Shin-dong typed the answer to the line-up card, a door slide up and reveal a small hidden room.
Lee Jang-won, Kim Ji-seok & Ha Seok-jin typed the same answer on the typewriter, a door slide up but another slide door is blocking their way.13. Room of 1984 (1984년의 방)The room is placed with items from 1984.
Byung-jae read a children diary written in 1984. There was a 1989 newspaper cutting on the a tragedy where Park In-gang died and Park Kang-in survived.
Lee Jang-won, Kim Ji-seok & Ha Seok-jin view the interview video and found that Park Kang-in is afraid to see his own reflection on the mirror and always wear a mask and wig.
P.O search the bookshelf and found a book on Official Baseball Guide for 1985.
As Lee Jang-won, Kim Ji-seok & Ha Seok-jin were discussing on the 1984 event, they had a chainsaw sound from the room that they were not able to enter earlier. Park Kang-in emerged from the room with the chainsaw. Lee Jang-won, Kim Ji-seok & Ha Seok-jin escaped from the Room 304 and use the mirror that they have made earlier to fend off Park Kang-in.14. (20개의 숫자)Lee Jang-won, Kim Ji-seok & Ha Seok-jin reported to the cast that Park Kang-in appeared with the chainsaw and suggested that the cast should make a mirror to fend off Park Kang-in. The cast scrambled to make a mirror.
Kim Ji-seok found a tattoo on the eyebrows of the fainted Park Kang-in, "84.5.5". Kim Ji-seok also handcuff one of Park Kang-in's hand to the leg of the table.
The cast, Lee Jang-won, Kim Ji-seok & Ha Seok-jin have to find out what was the scorecard for 9 October 1984. The cast found the result and relay to Lee Jang-won, Kim Ji-seok & Ha Seok-jin to input to the exit iron door. The passcode did not open the door.15. Last Door (마지막 문)Lee Jang-won, Kim Ji-seok & Ha Seok-jin suggested to the cast to find the scorecard for 5 May 1984. After entering the result to the iron door, both exit doors opened.
Both teams escaped via the staircases.'|-
!13
|Special Episode
|9 June 2019
|colspan="2"| Review of Season 2
|Kim Jong-min is absent for this episode
|-
|}

Season 3

Season 4

Great Escape Universe
Also known as DTCU. Some of the escape missions are related to other escape missions or belong in the same world, based on the story lines and/or the characters involved in the escape missions.

Ratings
 Note that the show airs on a cable channel (pay TV), which plays part in its slower uptake and relatively small audience share when compared to programs broadcast (FTA) on public networks such as KBS, SBS, MBC or EBS.

Awards and nominations

International version
Chinese franchise
In 2019, Mango Television purchased the rights for a Chinese adaptation of the show, titled Great Escape (密室大逃脫), which premiered on 30 March 2019.

 Russian franchise

In 2023, channel STS  will release a Russian official adaptation of the format, titled   Большой побег, which will premiere on 7 March 2023.

Vietnamese franchise
In 2022, a program called Thử thách trốn thoát'', is currently airing on channel VTV3 at 9.15pm every Sunday night.

Notes

References

External links
 
 
 
 

2018 South Korean television series debuts
2010s South Korean television series
2020s South Korean television series
Korean-language television shows
TVN (South Korean TV channel) original programming
South Korean variety television shows